The FIBT World Championships 1987 took place in St. Moritz, Switzerland for the record fifteenth time. The Swiss city had hosted the event previously in 1931 (Four-man), 1935 (Four-man), 1937 (Four-man), 1938 (Two-man), 1939 (Two-man), 1947, 1955, 1957, 1959, 1965, 1970, 1974, 1977, and 1982. The skeleton event that was at the 1982 championships was not included at this one when the championships returned to St. Moritz.

Two man bobsleigh

Four man bobsleigh

Medal table

References
2-Man bobsleigh World Champions
4-Man bobsleigh World Champions

1987
1987 in Swiss sport
Sport in St. Moritz
1987 in bobsleigh
International sports competitions hosted by Switzerland
Bobsleigh in Switzerland